Khlong Tamru is a tambon (subdistrict) of Mueang Chon Buri District, in Chon Buri Province, Thailand. In 2018 it had a total population of 8,050 people.

Administration

Central administration
The tambon is subdivided into 6 administrative villages (muban).

Local administration
The area of the subdistrict is shared by 2 local governments.
the subdistrict municipality (Thesaban Tambon) Khlong Tamru (เทศบาลตำบลคลองตำหรุ)
the subdistrict administrative organization (SAO) Khlong Tamru (องค์การบริหารส่วนตำบลคลองตำหรุ)

References

External links
Thaitambon.com on Khlong Tamru

Tambon of Chon Buri Province